Audrey Albié (born 24 October 1994) is a French professional tennis player.

She has career-high WTA rankings of 278 in singles, attained on 22 April 2019, and 228 in doubles, set on 28 February 2022. Albié has won three singles titles and four doubles titles on tournaments of the ITF Women's Circuit.

Career
Albié made her Grand Slam debut at the 2017 French Open, where she received a wildcard for the women's doubles draw; she and her partner Harmony Tan lost to Pauline Parmentier and Yanina Wickmayer in the first round. Albié also was given a wildcard for the singles qualifying event of the same tournament, where she defeated world No. 186, Grace Min, in the first round before losing to Virginie Razzano.

Grand Slam singles performance timeline

ITF Circuit finals

Singles: 11 (4 titles, 7 runner–ups)

Doubles: 14 (4 titles, 10 runner–ups)

Notes

References

External links
 
 

1994 births
Living people
French female tennis players